Olen "Bull" Finch (March 1, 1893 – March 9, 1956) was a professional football player who played in the National Football League with the Los Angeles Buccaneers in 1926. He played only one season in the NFL.

Notes

References
Pro Football Archives: Bull Finch

1893 births
Players of American football from Nebraska
Whittier Poets football players
Los Angeles Buccaneers players
1956 deaths
People from Valley County, Nebraska